Convent Station is an unincorporated community located within Morris Township, in Morris County, New Jersey, United States. located east of Morristown.

Among the neighborhoods of Convent Station are Bradwahl, Cromwell Hills, and the Normandy Park Historic District.  The Morris Township Municipal Building and the Morris Township Police Headquarters are in Convent Station.

History
The community is named after the railroad station that was constructed there during the 1870s to serve the  complex of the Academy of Saint Elizabeth, a Catholic school currently operatIng under the auspices of the Roman Catholic Diocese of Paterson. The academy,  the first secondary school for young women in the state, was founded in 1860 by the Sisters of Charity of Saint Elizabeth of New Jersey. The academy is a private college preparatory school for young women with an enrollment of two hundred and thirty students.

In 1865, Morristown incorporated with a boundary that excluded the convent's large land holdings. That boundary line separated the two in 1895 when Morristown was formally set off from the township.

The College of Saint Elizabeth, which was founded on the campus in 1899, is the oldest college for women in New Jersey and one of the first Catholic colleges in the United States to award degrees to women. The Saint Elizabeth campus also includes the Villa of Saint Ann. At one time there also was a kindergarten and elementary school on the campus and, for many years, the complex was sustained by dairy products and produce from its own large farm.

The community is named after the railroad station that was constructed there during the 1870s to serve the  complex of the Academy of Saint Elizabeth, a Catholic school currently operatIng under the auspices of the Roman Catholic Diocese of Paterson.

Industry
Honeywell's global headquarters is located here.

Culture

Notable people
People who were born in, residents of, or otherwise closely associated with Convent Station include:
A.B. Frost (1851-1928), American illustrator and painter
 Connor Lade (born 1989), professional soccer player.

References

External links 
Honeywell
The Morris Museum
College of Saint Elizabeth
Sisters of Charity

Morris Township, New Jersey
Unincorporated communities in Morris County, New Jersey
Unincorporated communities in New Jersey